Haglöfs AB is an outdoor equipment brand founded in 1914 in Sweden by Wiktor Haglöf.

Business 
Haglöfs is sold in 21 markets via: Wholesale (direct accounts as well as through distributors), has e-commerce in 12 countries, and runs 12 own stores.

Haglöfs has been a wholly owned subsidiary of ASICS Corporation since 2010. ASICS Corporation is headquartered in Kobe, Japan and is listed on the Tokyo Stock Exchange. Haglöfs operates through subsidiaries in Sweden, Norway, Finland, Denmark, Germany and the United Kingdom, while ASICS Corporation manages Haglöfs' operations in Japan.

Haglöfs designs, develops and markets clothing, shoes and hardware for outdoor use from its head office in Alvik, Stockholm, Sweden. Haglöfs does not own any factories, but collaborates with a network of over 80 material suppliers and manufacturers of clothing, shoes and hardware in 17 different countries. The majority of Haglöfs' products are sent to their warehouse in Avesta, Sweden, from where they are distributed to various sales channels.

Haglöfs is currently sold in 21 markets via retailers and distributors, has e-commerce in 12 countries and 12 own stores. In 2020, the company sold products for SEK 724.5 million and had 234 employees worldwide, of which 165 in Sweden.

References

External links
 

Asics
Clothing companies of Sweden
Sportswear brands
Outdoor clothing brands
Clothing companies established in 1914
Swedish brands
Dalarna County
Swedish companies established in 1914